Usherville is a hamlet in the Canadian province of Saskatchewan.

Demographics 

References

Designated places in Saskatchewan
Organized hamlets in Saskatchewan
Preeceville No. 334, Saskatchewan
Division No. 9, Saskatchewan